Iso Lamujärvi is a medium-sized lake in the Siikajoki main catchment area. It is located in the region Northern Ostrobothnia in Finland.

There are eight islands in the lake.

See also
List of lakes in Finland

References

Lakes of Pyhäntä